Tugali colvillensis is a species of small sea snail or limpet, a marine gastropod mollusc in the family Fissurellidae, the keyhole limpets and slit limpets.

References

 Powell A W B, William Collins Publishers Ltd, Auckland 1979 

Fissurellidae
Gastropods described in 1927
Taxa named by Harold John Finlay